Cisthene deserta is a moth of the family Erebidae. It was described by Felder in 1868. It is found in North America, where it has been recorded from Utah and California.

The length of the forewings is 9–11 mm. Adults are on wing from April to July.

References

Cisthenina
Moths described in 1868